Lilium pyrenaicum (Pyrenean lily, yellow Turk's-cap lily, yellow martagon lily) is native to montane regions, mainly the Pyrenees, from Spain and eastwards, with the range extending into the Caucasus. It grows up to 1.3 m high. It bears up to 12 Turks-cap shaped flowers. These are yellow, orange or red, and has an unusual musky scent, which some people find unpleasant.

References

Patrick M. Synge: Collins Guide to Bulbs. 1961.
European Garden Flora; vol. 1, 1986.

pyrenaicum
Flora of Southwestern Europe
Flora of Southeastern Europe
Flora of the Caucasus
Flora of the Pyrenees